Gumbleton is a surname. Notable people with this surname include:

Frank Gumbleton (born 1951), Australian rules footballer
Scott Gumbleton (born 1988), Australian rules footballer
Thomas Gumbleton (born 1930), American Roman Catholic bishop
William Edward Gumbleton (1840–1911), Irish horticulturalist